Robert Sandiford (12 August 1900 – 1967) was an English footballer who played for Rochdale when they joined the Football League in 1921.

References

1900 births
1967 deaths
Footballers from Rochdale
English footballers
Association football inside forwards
Rochdale A.F.C. players
Bacup Borough F.C. players
York City F.C. players
Stalybridge Celtic F.C. players
English Football League players